Haitiana is a genus of planthoppers belonging to the family Achilidae.

Species
Species:
 Haitiana nigrita Dozier, 1936

References

Achilidae